The Chamita Formation is a geologic formation in north-central New Mexico. It preserves unique fossils dating back to the Neogene period. The presence of volcanic ash beds in the formation, which can be radiometrically dated, gives the absolute age of the fossils, which is valuable for establishing the geologic time scale of the Neogene.

Description
The formation is mostly coarse quartz sandstone with some coarse gravel. It varies greatly in thickness, likely due to extensive erosion.

There are two prominent tuffaceous zones used by Galusha and Blick for regional correlation. Radiometric dating shows that the age of the Upper Chamita Tuffaceous Zone is 6.93 ±0.05 million years at its base and 6.78 ±0.03 million years at its top, essentially identical with the Peralta Tuff, which it also chemically resembles. This helps establish the absolute date for the late Hemphillian, since a fossil assemblage of that stage is found in the zone. The Lower Chamita Tuffaceous Zone has a radiometric age of 7.7 ±0.3 million years. The age range for the complete section has been estimated as 9.5 to 5.8 million years. However, more recent work has yielded an age range of 12 to 13 Ma for a Lower Coarse White Ash Zone towards the base of the formation, which is thickest northeast of the Jemez Mountains and has been interpreted as ash fall from early silicic volcanic activity from vents now buried under later flows.

The base of the formation contains sediments resembling the underlying Ojo Caliente Member of the Tesuque Formation. This is interpreted as reworking of sediments in a changed sedimentation environment rather than interfingering. In other words, the lower part of the formation contains sediments eroded from the Ojo Caliente Member, rather than recording a fluctuating depositional environment.

Members of the formation include the Cejita and Cuarteles Members west of the modern Rio Grande River and the Pilar Mesa, Vallito, and Hernandez Members on both sides of the Rio Grande.

Fossil content
The Round Mountain Quarry has produced numerous fossils from the Chamita Formation. The artiodactyl Osbornoceros osborni was first located in the formation in the Lyden area, as was the only known specimen of the taxideine badger, Chamitataxus.

Mammals

Carnivorans

Lagomorphs

Proboscideans

Rodents

Ungulates

History of investigation
The beds making up the unit were originally included by Bryan and McCann in 1937 in the Middle Red member of the Santa Fe Formation.  This became the Tesuque Formation in 1956.

In 1971, Galusha and Blick split the uppermost beds from the Tesuque Formation as the Chamita Formation based on differences in lithology and fossil assemblage.

Footnotes

See also

 List of fossiliferous stratigraphic units in New Mexico
 Paleontology in New Mexico

References
 
 
 
 
 
 

Neogene formations of New Mexico